Trönö IK is a Swedish football club located in Trönödal in Hälsingland.

Background
Since their foundation Trönö IK has participated mainly in the middle and lower divisions of the Swedish football league system.  The club currently plays in Division 3 Södra Norrland which is the fifth tier of Swedish football. They play their home matches at the Trönö IP in Trönödal.

Trönö IK are affiliated to Hälsinglands Fotbollförbund.

Recent history
In recent seasons Trönö IK have competed in the following divisions:

2011 – Division III, Södra Norrland
2010 – Division III, Södra Norrland
2009 – Division IV, Hälsingland
2008 – Division IV, Hälsingland
2007 – Division IV, Hälsingland
2006 – Division IV, Hälsingland
2005 – Division V, Hälsingland
2004 – Division IV, Hälsingland
2003 – Division V, Hälsingland
2002 – Division V, Hälsingland
2001 – Division V, Hälsingland
2000 – Division V Hälsingland
1999 – Division V Hälsingland

Current Squad for the 2011 season

Attendances
In recent seasons Trönö IK have had the following average attendances:

Footnotes

External links
 Trönö IK – Official website
 Trönö IK on Facebook

Football clubs in Gävleborg County